Animal Tracks is the second studio album by British R&B/blues rock band the Animals. It was released in May 1965, on Columbia, and was the group's last album with the full participation of Alan Price until the release of the original quintet's 1977 reunion album, Before We Were So Rudely Interrupted. It reached No. 6 on the UK Albums Chart and remained there for 26 weeks.

Track listing

Personnel 
The Animals
 Eric Burdon – lead vocals
 Hilton Valentine – guitar, vocals
 Alan Price – keyboards, vocals
 Chas Chandler – bass, vocals
 John Steel – drums, percussion
Technical
 Mickie Most – producer, liner notes
 Val Valentin – engineer

Charts

References 

1965 albums
The Animals albums
EMI Columbia Records albums
Albums produced by Mickie Most